Miltonia spectabilis, the outstanding miltonia, is a species of orchid occurring in extreme eastern Brazil and has been erroneously reported to occur in Venezuela. It is the type species of the genus Miltonia.

References

External links 

spectabilis
Endemic orchids of Brazil
Flora of the Atlantic Forest